The first season of the Code Geass anime series, titled , is produced by Sunrise, Mainichi Broadcasting System, and Project Geass. The series was directed by Gorō Taniguchi who cooperated with Ichirō Ōkouchi on the script. The characters were conceived by Clamp and designed by Takahiro Kimura. The plot follows Lelouch vi Britannia who leads a rebellion group called the Black Knights to oppose the superpower, Britannia.

The production of Code Geass: Lelouch of the Rebellion was revealed by an internet trailer in 2006. It premiered on MBS TV on October 6, 2006, and was broadcast by a total of ten stations. The final two episodes were aired on July 29, 2007, and received an early screening in Tokyo and Osaka theaters a week earlier. Bandai Visual encapsulated the episodes into nine volumes in DVD, Blu-ray, and Universal Media Disc formats. Each volume contained a picture drama episode as a bonus. The nine volumes were re-released into two DVD volumes, then re-released as a single adaptation called Special Edition Black Rebellion, and then re-released in a box collection; the latter two were released in both DVD and Blu-ray format.

During the 2007 Otakon, Bandai Entertainment announced its acquisition of Code Geass: Lelouch of the Rebellion for a North American release. The dubbing was produced by ZRO Limit Productions with Taniguchi advising on what characteristics the character's voice should portray. Bandai Entertainment released the series as individual volumes and parts. Four volumes were released containing the first seventeen episodes and three parts contained the whole series. A box collection was released on March 22, 2011. The English dub aired on Adult Swim between April 27, 2008, and October 26, 2008. Bandai Entertainment added the episodes to their YouTube channel beginning on February 1, 2009. The episodes were then made available on Crunchyroll between April 25, 2009, until December 31, 2012. During the 2013 Otakon, Funimation announced its acquisition of the series.

In the United Kingdom, Beez Entertainment and Kazé each released a box collection of the series. Madman Entertainment announced its license of the series in July 2008 for Australasia. It began airing the series on ABC2 and ABC iview beginning January 19 until June 29, 2009. Madman streamed the first two episode on their website in April 2009. The series was then released as a DVD and Blu-ray collection.

The episodes use five pieces of theme music: three opening and two ending themes. For the first 12 episodes, the opening theme is "Colors" performed by Flow while the ending theme is  performed by Ali Project. For the rest of the season, the opening theme is  performed by Jinn and the ending theme is  performed by SunSet Swish. Episodes 24 and 25 had the opening theme  performed by Access.

For the 15th anniversary rebroadcast edition, the opening theme for the first thirteen episodes is "Dice" by Flow while the ending theme is "Will-ill" by TK from Ling tosite Sigure. For the rest of the season, the opening theme is "Phoenix Prayer" by Eir Aoi and the ending theme is "Sakura Burst" by Cö Shu Nie.



Episode list

Home media release

Japanese
Bandai Visual released the episodes in nine volumes in DVD, Blu-ray, and Universal Media Disc media format. The nine volumes were compressed into two volumes and released as DVD Magazines. The Black Rebellion is a special edition which concentrates the series into one disc. Eventually, the nine volumes were released as a box collection in DVD and Blu-ray format.

English
In North America, Bandai Entertainment released the four volumes containing the first seventeen episodes. Bandai then released the series into three volumes labeled as parts. A box collection of the series was released on March 22, 2011.

In the United Kingdom, Beez Entertainment and Kazé released the series as a box collection. Beez's DVD box collection was released on March 21, 2011. Kazé announced its acquisition of the series during the London MCM Expo in October 2012. Kazé released a DVD and Blu-ray box collection on January 21, 2013, and had Manga Entertainment distribute the series. In Australasia, Madman Entertainment released a DVD collection on November 18, 2009, and a Blu-ray collection on April 17, 2013.

Picture drama
The  episodes are still images and character voices used to tell a story. In Japan, a picture drama was added to every individual volume. In 2013, a Blu-ray box collection was released and contained a new picture drama episode. In North America, three picture dramas were added to every part.

Notes

References

External links

2006 Japanese television seasons
2007 Japanese television seasons
Rebellion